Ogni is a rural locality (a selo) in Turochaksky District, the Altai Republic, Russia. The population was 17 as of 2016. There are 2 streets.

Geography 
Ogni is located 16 km south of Turochak (the district's administrative centre) by road. Tondoshka is the nearest rural locality.

References 

Rural localities in Turochaksky District